The Party of New Liberals was a shortly lived liberal political party in Greece.

The party was founded by Constantine Mitsotakis in 1977. It took part in only one election, that of 1977, where it obtained 1.08% of the vote and two seats in the Hellenic Parliament (the other seat being filled by Pavlos Vardinoyannis).

The New Liberals merged into the New Democracy party in 1978.

1977 establishments in Greece
1978 disestablishments in Greece
Political parties established in 1977
Political parties disestablished in 1978
Liberal parties in Greece
Liberal conservative parties
Defunct political parties in Greece
Centrist parties in Greece
Conservative parties in Greece
Social liberal parties